List of franchise records for the Florida Panthers of the National Hockey League.

Career leaders 

†As of April 29, 2022

‡Minimum 75 games played with the franchise

Single season records

Team

†Excluding the lockout-shortened 1994–95 and 2012–13 NHL seasons.

Skaters

Goalies

Single game records

Team

References
Florida Panthers Player Records (career)
Florida Panthers Player Records (single season)
Florida Panthers Team Records (single period)
Florida Panthers Team Records (single game)
Florida Panthers Team Records (single season)
Florida Panthers Franchise at Hockey Reference

Records
Panthers